A transport museum is a museum that holds collections of transport items, which are often limited to land transport (road and rail)—including old cars, motorcycles, trucks, trains, trams/streetcars, buses, trolleybuses and coaches—but can also include air transport or waterborne transport items, along with educational displays and other old transport objects. Some transport museums are housed in disused transport infrastructure such as dismantled trolley systems, former engine sheds or bus garages.

Many transport museums exist throughout the world, listed below.

Argentina 
 Tramway Histórico de Buenos Aires, Caballito, Buenos Aires, ;

Australia 
 Archer Park Rail Museum, Rockhampton, Queensland
 Australian National Maritime Museum, Sydney, New South Wales
 Australian Road Transport Heritage Centre, Gundagai, New South Wales
 Ballarat Tramway Museum, Ballarat, Victoria 
 Bendigo Tram Museum, Bendigo, Victoria 
 Brisbane Tramway Museum, Ferny Grove, Queensland
 Bus Preservation Society of Western Australia, Whiteman Park, Perth
 Canberra Railway Museum, Canberra, Australian Capital Territory
 Dorrigo Steam Railway & Museum, Dorrigo, New South Wales
 Glenreagh Mountain Railway, Glenreagh, New South Wales
 Goulburn Rail Heritage Centre, Goulburn, New South Wales
 Hawthorn tram depot, Hawthorn, Melbourne, Victoria
 Lachlan Valley Railway, Cowra, New South Wales
 National Railway Museum, Port Adelaide, South Australia
 National Road Transport Hall of Fame, Alice Springs, Northern Territory
 NSW Rail Museum, Thirlmere, New South Wales
 Old Ghan Heritage Railway and Museum, Alice Springs, Northern Territory
 Pichi Richi Railway – Quorn to Port Augusta, South Australia
 Puffing Billy Railway, Belgrave, Victoria
 Qantas Founders Outback Museum, Longreach, Queensland
 Queensland Motorsport Museum, Ipswich, Queensland
 Rail Heritage WA, Bassendean, Western Australia
 Rail Motor Society, Paterson, New South Wales
 Revolutions Transport Museum, Whiteman Park, Western Australia
 Shepparton Motor Museum, Shepparton, Victoria
 South Australian Maritime Museum, Port Adelaide, South Australia
 Steamtown Heritage Rail Centre, Peterborough, South Australia
 Sydney Bus Museum, Leichhardt, Sydney, New South Wales
 Sydney Heritage Fleet, Rozelle, Sydney, New South Wales
 Sydney Tramway Museum, Loftus, Sydney, New South Wales
 Tasmanian Transport Museum, Glenorchy, Tasmania 
 Tramway Museum Society of Victoria, Bylands, Victoria 
 Tramway Museum, St Kilda, South Australia
 Valley Heights Locomotive Depot Heritage Museum, Valley Heights, New South Wales
 Western Australia's Heritage Tramway, Whiteman Park, Western Australia
 Western Australian Maritime Museum, Fremantle, Western Australia
 Zig Zag Railway, near Lithgow, New South Wales.

Austria 
 TMB's Innsbruck Tramway Museum, Innsbruck – 
 Graz Tramway Museum, Graz – 
 SKGLB-Museum, Mondsee
Vienna Transport Museum Remise, Vienna

Belgium 
Brussels Tram Museum (MTUB (fr) / MSVB (nl)), Woluwe-Saint-Pierre, Brussels,  – streetcar/tram/trolleybus
Tramsite Schepdaal, Schepdaal – streetcar/tram
Centre de découverte du Vicinal, Trammuseum of the ASVi, Thuin – interurban and rural streetcar/tram
Flemish Tram and Bus Museum (VlaTAM), Berchem, Antwerp – streetcar/tram/bus
Musée des Transports en Commun de Wallonie (MTCW), Liège – streetcar / tram / interurban and rural tram / trolleybus / motorbus
Train World, Schaerbeek — Railway Museum
CFV3V, Mariembourg, Treignes — Railway Museum

Bermuda 
 Railway Museum and Curiosity Shop, Hamilton

Brazil 
 Museu Aeronáutico de Guarulhos, Guarulhos
 Museu Asas de um Sonho, São Carlos
 Museu do Automóvel de São Paulo, São Paulo
 Museu dos Transportes Públicos Gaetano Ferolla, São Paulo
 Museu Ferroviário Barão de Mauá, Jundiaí, – Railways (Avenida União dos Ferroviários)
 Museu Ferroviário de Bauru, Bauru
 Museu Ferroviário de Campinas, Campinas
 Museu Tecnológico Ferroviário, Santo André
 Museu American Old Trucks, Canela - Grupo Dreams
 Museu Hollywood Dreams Cars, Gramado - Grupo Dreams

Bulgaria 
 National Transport Museum, Rousse

Canada 
Alberta Railway Museum, Edmonton, Alberta – 
British Columbia Aviation Museum, Sidney, British Columbia
Canadian Museum of Flight, Langley, British Columbia
Canadian Railway Museum, Saint-Constant, Québec
Canadian Transportation Museum & Heritage Village, Essex, Ontario – 
Edmonton Radial Railway Society, Edmonton, Alberta
Halton County Radial Railway, Rockwood, Ontario
Marine Museum of the Great Lakes, Kingston, Ontario – 
Muskoka Marine Museum, Huntsville, Ontario – 
Railway Coastal Museum, St. John's, Newfoundland and Labrador – 
Reynolds-Alberta Museum, Wetaskiwin, Alberta, automobiles
Saskatchewan Railway Museum, Saskatoon Saskatchewan
Western Canada Aviation Museum, Winnipeg, Manitoba
Winnipeg Railway Museum, Winnipeg, Manitoba

China
China Aviation Museum, Changping, Beijing – (200 airplanes)
China Railway Museum, Beijing
Shanghai Metro Museum, Shanghai
Shanghai Railway Museum, Shanghai

Croatia 

 Croatian Railway Museum, Zagreb (Croatian: Hrvatski željeznički muzej)

Czech Republic 
National Technical Museum, Prague 
Muzeum městské hromadné dopravy v Praze (Prague Public Transport Museum, Praha Střešovice)
Železniční muzeum ČD (Lužná u Rakovníka)
Železniční muzeum Zlonice
Zubrnická museální železnice
Muzeum těžby a dopravy vápence v Českém Krasu – Skanzen Solvayovy lomy
Muzeum Pošumavských železnic Nové Údolí
Muzeum koněspřežné železnice České Budějovice
Výtopna Jaroměř
Muzeum průmyslových železnic Mladějov

Denmark
Bornholm Automobilmuseum, Bornholm, Region Hovedstaden – 
Danish Railway Museum, Odense – 
Danish Tramway Museum, Skjoldenæsholm, near Ringsted – 
Dansk Veteranflysamling, Skjern, Midtsjælland  – Scandinavian airplanes
Vikingeskibsmuseet, Roskilde, Midtsjælland – Viking ships

Estonia
Estonian Railway Museum, Haapsalu

Finland
 Finnish Railway Museum, Hyvinkää
 Aviation Museum of Central Finland, Tikkakoski, Central Finland
 Finnish Aviation Museum, Vantaa, near Helsinki's international airport
 Kotka Maritime Center

France
Cité de l'Automobile, Mulhouse : car museum
Musée Français du Chemin de Fer : railway museum
Musée Maurice Dufresne
Musée de l'Aventure Peugeot, Sochaux, Kanton Sochaux-Grand-Charmont – Peugeot-Automobile – 
Musée des 24 Heures du Mans
Musée de l'Air, Le Bourget : Airplane Museum

Germany
PS Speicher in Einbeck
Museum of Ancient Seafaring in Mainz
DB Museum, Nuremberg, operated by Deutsche Bahn AG — rail transport in Germany
Deutsches Schiffahrtsmuseum in Bremerhaven — water transport
Otto-Lilienthal-Museum, air transport
Eisenbahnmuseum Bochum, Bochum in the suburb Dahlhausen at the river Ruhr — railway museum
Eisenbahnmuseum Neustadt Neustadt (Weinstrasse) in central Rhineland-Palatinate (Rheinland-Pfalz)
Auto & Technik Museum, Sinsheim, Baden-Württemberg
Hannoversches Straßenbahn-Museum, Sehnde near Hannover
Deutsches Museum Verkehrszentrum, Munich, Bavaria
Deutsches Museum Flugwerft, Oberschleißheim, Bavaria
Deutsches Dampflokomotiv-Museum Neuenmarkt-Wirsberg in northern Bavaria
MVG Museum, Munich, Bavaria
Schifffahrtsmuseum Flensburg in Flensburg, Schleswig-Holstein
Straßenbahnmuseum Dresden, Dresden, Sachsen
Verkehrsmuseum Dresden, Dresden, Sachsen
Verkehrsmuseum Frankfurt am Main, Frankfurt, Hesse
Verein Historische Straßenbahn in Köln

Greece
 Aegean Maritime Museum, Mykonos
 Andros Maritime Museum, Andros
 Electric Railways Museum of Piraeus
 Hellenic Air Force Museum, Athens
 Hellenic Maritime Museum, Piraeus
 Hellenic Motor Museum, Athens
 Nautical Museum of Crete, Chania
 Phaethon Museum of Technology (cars), Oropos
 Railway Museum of Athens
 Railway Museum of Thessaloniki
 Thessaly Railway Museum, Volos

Hong Kong
 Hong Kong Maritime Museum, Central, City of Victoria 
Hong Kong Railway Museum, Tai Po District, New Territories

Hungary
Hungarian Railway History Park, Budapest  – Railways
Budapest Transport Museum, City Park (past), Diesel Hall - former Északi Vehicle Repair Center (future), Budapest – 
 Urban Public Transport History Museum, Szentendre.
 Millennium Underground Railway Museum, Deák Ferenc Square, Budapest.

India
Kursura Submarine Museum, Visakhapatnam, Andhra Pradesh - Submarine Museum
TU 142 Aircraft Museum, Visakhapatnam, Andhra Pradesh - Aircraft Museum
Heritage Transport Museum, Gurgaon, Haryana - Transport Museum

Indonesia
Ambarawa Railway Museum, Ambarawa
Maritime Museum, Jakarta
Museum Angkut, Batu
Transport Museum, Taman Mini Indonesia Indah, Jakarta

Ireland
Ulster Folk and Transport Museum, Belfast
National Maritime Museum of Ireland, Dublin – Ships 
National Transport Museum of Ireland, (Iarsmalann Náisiunta Iompair na hÉireann), Howth, Fingal 
Foynes Flying Boat Museum, Foynes – Flugboote

Isle of Man
Jurby Transport Museum, Jurby – 
Manx Electric Railway Museum, Derby Castle, Douglas – 
Manx Transport Museum, Peel – 
Port Erin Railway Museum, Port Erin

Israel
Israel Railway Museum, Haifa –

Italy
 Museo Ferrari, Maranello
 Ducati Museum, Bologna
 Museo Nazionale dell'Automobile, Turin
 Moto Guzzi Museum, Mandello del Lario
 Alfa Romeo Museum, Arese
 Museo Piaggio Giovanni Alberto Agnelli, Pontedera - 
 Museo Nazionale della Scienza e della Tecnologia, Milan
 Museo Nazionale dei Trasporti, La Spezia – 
 Museo Ferroviario Piemontese, Savigliano, Turin
 Museo Europeo dei Trasporti Ogliari, Ranco, Varese - 
 Museo Ferroviario di Trieste Campo Marzio, Trieste 
 Museo Nazionale Ferroviario di Pietrarsa, Naples

Japan
Honda Collection Hall, Motegi - automobiles, motorcycles
Hiroshima City Transportation Museum, Hiroshima – Tramways 
Matsuda Collection, Gotemba, Shizuoka - automobiles
Kyoto Railway Museum, Kyoto - Railway 
Modern Transportation Museum, Osaka, Osaka – Railways 
Nagahama Railroad Square, Nagahama, Shiga
Ome Railway Park, Ome, Tokyo
Railway Museum, Saitama, Saitama – Railway
SCMaglev and Railway Park, Nagoya - Railway 
Tokyo Subway Museum, Tokyo 
Kyushu Railway History Museum, Kitakyushu, Fukuoka 
Tokyo Subway Museum, Tokyo 
Tokyo Transportation Museum, Tokyo (Closed) 
Toyota Automobile Museum, Nukata District, Aichi  – Automobiles (also other brands) 
Umekōji Steam Locomotive Museum, Kyoto – Steam locomotives 
Usui Pass Railway Heritage Park, Annaka, Gunma - Railways
Yokohama Municipal Tramway Museum, Yokohama

Kuwait
Historical, Vintage, and Classical Cars Museum, Kuwait City - 
Maritime Museum of Kuwait, Kuwait City, Kuwait

Latvia
Latvian Railway History Museum, Riga – 
Riga Motor Museum, Riga –

Lithuania
Lithuanian Railway Museum, Vilnius –

Luxembourg
Luxembourg's tram and bus museum, Luxembourg City –

Mexico
Ferrocarril Interoceanico heritage railway & museum. Cuautla, Morelos – 
Museo de los Ferrocarriles de Yucatán, Mérida, Yucatán, 
Museo Nacional de los Ferrocarriles Mexicanos, Puebla, Puebla
Museo Tecnológico de la Comisión Federal de Electricidad (MUTEC), Mexico City 
Museo del Transporte, Xalapa, Veracruz
Museo del Ferrocarril de Torreón, Torreón, Coahuila

Namibia
Trans-Namib Railroad Museum

Netherlands

Aviodrome, Lelystad, Flevoland – Aviation
Elekrische Museumtramlijn, Amsterdam, North Holland - Tramway
DAF Museum, Eindhoven, North Brabant – Automobile
Haags Openbaar Vervoer Museum, The Hague, South Holland – Streetcars/tram
Nationaal Openbaar vervoer Museum NOV, Ouwsterhaule, Friesland – Railways/Busses
Nationaal Bus Museum NBM, Hoogezand, Groningen – Busses
Industrieel Smalspoor Museum, Erica, Drenthe - Industrial narrow gauge railway
Louwman Museum - The Hague, South Holland – Automobile
Marinemuseum Den Helder, Den Helder, North Holland – Ships (Koninklijke Marine)
Museum Buurtspoorweg, Haaksbergen, Overijssel – Railways
National Carriage Museum, Leek, Groningen (province) - Carriages
Dutch Railway Museum, Utrecht (city), Utrecht (province) -  – Railways
Nederlands Transport Museum, Nieuw-Vennep, North Hollandair, road and rail vehicles
NZH Public Transport Museum, Haarlem, North Holland - Public transport by the former NZH
Museumstoomtram Hoorn-Medemblik, Hoorn, North Holland - Steamtram
Stoom Stichting Nederland, Rotterdam, South Holland – Steamlocomotives
Trammuseum Rotterdam, Rotterdam, South Holland - Trams
Trolleybus Museum Arnhem, Arnhem, Gelderland - Trolley Busses
Veluwsche Stoomtrein Maatschappij, Beekbergen, Gelderland – Railways
Stoomtrein Katwijk Leiden, Valkenburg, South Holland – Narrow gauge, formerly known as Stoomtrein Valkenburgse Meer / Nationaal Smalspoormuseum

New Zealand
List of New Zealand railway museums and heritage lines
Christchurch City Tramway
Ferrymead Heritage Park, Christchurch, 
Foxton Trolleybus Museum, Horowhenua
Museum of Transport and Technology, Auckland 
National Maritime Museum, Auckland
National Transport and Toy Museum, Wānaka 
Otago Settlers Museum, Dunedin
Packard and Pioneer Museum, Northland
Southward Car Museum, Kapiti Coast
Wellington Tramway Museum, Kapiti Coast 
Transport World, Invercargill

Norway
 Old Voss Line Railway Museum, Bergen
 Krøderen Line Railway Museum, Krøderen – 
 Norwegian Railway Museum, Hamar, 
 Norwegian Aviation Museum, Bodø, 
 Setesdal Line Railway Museum, Vennesla,
 Sporveismuseet Vognhall 5, Oslo – Tramway 
 Trondheim Tramway Museum, Trondheim – 
Viking Ship Museum (Oslo), Oslo http://www.ukm.uio.no/vikingskipshuset/index_eng.html

Pakistan
 PAF Museum, Karachi
 Pakistan Maritime Museum, Karachi
 Pakistan Railways Heritage Museum, near Islamabad

Poland

 Warsaw Railway Museum, Warsaw – Railways
 Polish Aviation Museum, Kraków,  – Aviation, http://www.muzeumlotnictwa.pl/
 Narrow Gauge Railway Museum in Gryfice, Gryfice, Woiwodschaft Westpommern – Railways
 Narrow Gauge Railway Museum in Wenecja, Wenecja, Woiwodschaft Kujawien-Pommern – Railways https://web.archive.org/web/20090321044151/http://www.paluki.pl/mzp/kolejka.php
 Skansen Parowozownia Kościerzyna, Kościerzyna, Pomeranian Voivodeship, – Railways
 Museum of city transport, Poznań
 Bydbus Zabytkowe Autobusy, Bydgoszcz, Woiwodschaft Kujawien-Pommern http://zabytkowe-autobusy.pl/ http://bydbus.cba.pl

Portugal
 Carris Museum, Lisbon
 Museu Nacional Ferroviário, Entroncamento – 
 Museu do Carro Eléctrico, Porto - 
 Museu dos Transportes e Comunicações, Porto

Russia 
 Central Railway Museum, Saint Petersburg – 
 Museum of Electrical Transport, Saint Petersburg (see in Russian)
 Moscow Metro Museum, Moscow – 
 Oktyabrskaya Railway Museum, Saint Petersburg – 
 Pereslavl Narrow Gauge Railway Museum, Pereslavl-Zalessky – 
 Museum of Carriages and Autocars, Moscow – 
 Vadim Zadorozhny's Technical Museum, Moscow – 
 Museum of Retro Cars, Moscow – 
 Museum of Urban Transport, Moscow – unofficial site
 Monino Air Force Museum, Moscow
 Museum of the Moscow Railway, Moscow

Saudi Arabia 
 Hejaz Railway Museum in Medina
 The Hejaz railway station at Mada'in Saleh

Serbia 
 Muzej Vazduhoplovstva, Belgrade
 Zeleznicki Muzej, Belgrade

Singapore 
 Land Transport Gallery, Singapore -

Slovakia 
 Museum of Transport, Bratislava – 
 Museum of Aviation, Košice – 
 Čierny Hron Railway heritage railway, Čierny Balog, Hronec et al.
 Historical Logging Switchback Railway heritage railway, Vychylovka
 Orava Logging Railway heritage railway, Oravská Lesná
 Railway Museum of Railway Depot "East", Bratislava
 Košice Children's Heritage Railway, Košice
 Museum of Transport, Rajecké Teplice
 Museum of Vintage Automobiles, Mlynica (defunct, moved)
 Exhibit of Vintage Automobiles, Kežmarok Museum, Kežmarok (moved from Mlynica)
 Classic Car Museum, Piešťany
 1st Slovak Private Transport Museum in Prešov, Prešov-Šarišské Lúky  (private collections, open on demand)

Slovenia 
 Slovenian Railway Museum, Ljubljana

South Africa 
 James Hall Transport Museum, Johannesburg
 Franschhoek Motor Museum, Franschhoek -

Spain 

 Museo del Ferrocarril, Madrid
 Torre Loizaga, Biscay

Sweden
Nynäshamns Järnvägsmuseum, Nynäshamn – 
Nässjö Järnvägsmuseum, Nässjö – 
Spårvägsmuseet, Stockholm – 
Sveriges Järnvägsmuseum, Gävle – 
Marcus Wallenberg-hallen (Scania)
Bothnia Railway Museum, Luleå -

Switzerland
Heritage Railway Blonay-Chamby, Blonay, Waadt; Heritage Railway including a museum
Bahnmuseum Kerzers/Kallnach, Kerzers, FR und Kallnach, BE; Railways
EUROVAPOR (Railway Society)
Fliegermuseum Dübendorf, Dübendorf, ZH, – Aviation
Swiss Museum of Transport, Lucerne; Large Museum exhibiting all forms of transport.
Zürich Tram Museum, Zürich

Taiwan

 Chung Cheng Aviation Museum, Taoyuan City
 Evergreen Maritime Museum, Taipei City
 Kaohsiung Harbor Museum, Kaohsiung City
 Miaoli Railway Museum, Miaoli County
 Takao Railway Museum, Kaohsiung City
 Tamkang University Maritime Museum, New Taipei City
 Taxi Museum, Yilan County
 Wulai Tram Museum, New Taipei City

Turkey
Rahmi M. Koç Museum, Istanbul
Ural Ataman Classic Car Museum, Istanbul
Key Museum, İzmir

United Arab Emirates
Emirates National Auto Museum, Abu Dhabi

United Kingdom
List of British railway museums

England
 Amberley Museum & Heritage Centre, West Sussex – Motor buses, industrial narrow-gauge railways, road making
 Beamish Museum, Durham – Locomotives, trams, trolleys, motor buses
 Bentley Wildfowl and Motor Museum, Halland, East Sussex - Automobiles and motorcycles
 Black Country Living Museum, Dudley, West Midlands – trams and motor buses
 British Motor Museum, Gaydon, Warwickshire - Cars
 Brooklands, Weybridge, Surrey – Automobiles, aircraft
 Bury Transport Museum, Bury, Greater Manchester - Road vehicles, railway equipment, maps and signs
 C. M. Booth Collection of Historic Vehicles, Rolvenden, Kent - Pre-war automobiles and motorcycles
 Coventry Transport Museum, Coventry – Automobiles
 Cotswold Motoring Museum and Toy Collection, Bourton on the Water, Gloucestershire – Automobiles and nostalgia
 Dewsbury Bus Museum, West Yorkshire - Motor buses and coaches - Home of two Guy Wulfrunian buses
 Donington Grand Prix Collection, Leicestershire – Motor Racing Cars
 East Anglia Transport Museum, Suffolk – Trams, Trolleys, Motor Buses
 Electric Railway Museum, Warwickshire – Electric Rail Traction, 
 Ensignbus transport museum, Essex – Motor Buses
 Fleet Air Arm Museum, Yeovilton, Somerset – Air Planes
 Greater Manchester's Museum of Transport, Manchester – Buses, 
 Haynes Motor Museum, Sparkford, Somerset – Automobiles, Motorcycles
 Heritage Motor Centre, Gaydon, Warwickshire – Automobiles
 Hopetown Carriage Works, Darlington, Durham
 Imperial War Museum Duxford Airfield, near Cambridge – Civilian and Military Planes, Tanks
 Ingrow Railway Centre, Keighley, West Yorkshire – Steam Locomotives
 Ipswich Transport Museum – Trams, Trolleys, Motor Buses
 London Bus Museum, Weybridge - London buses
 London Canal Museum, London – Canal
 London Motor Museum, Hayes, Hillingdon - Custom and American automobiles
 London Motorcycle Museum – Motorcycles
 London Transport Museum, London – Rail Rolling Stock, Trams, Trolleys, Motor buses
 Midland Air Museum, near Coventry, Warwickshire. – Airplanes
 Museum of Transport in Manchester – Buses, (Trolleys), some train ephemera.
 National Maritime Museum, Greenwich and Falmouth – Maritime
 National Motor Museum, Beaulieu, Hampshire – Cars, Motorcycles
 National Motorcycle Museum, Solihull, West Midlands
 National Railway Museum, York – Locomotives, carriages, wagons and all related railway equipment
 National Tramway Museum, near Matlock, Derbyshire – Trams
 National Waterways Museum, Gloucester – Inland waterways collection
 Newark Air Museum, Nottinghamshire – Airplanes
 North West Museum of Road Transport, St Helens - Buses, Cars, Fire Engines, Trucks and Trams.
 North East Land, Sea and Air Museums, Sunderland - Aircraft, Trams, Buses, Fire Appliances and military vehicles. 
 Nottingham Transport Heritage Centre, Nottinghamshire, – mainly railways, buses, cars
 Oxford Bus Museum, Long Hanborough – Buses
 Royal Air Force Museum, Hendon, London – Airplanes
 Royal Air Force Museum, Cosford, Shropshire – Airplanes
 Sammy Miller Motorcycle Museum, New Milton, Hampshire - Motorcycles
 Shildon Locomotion Museum, Durham – Locomotives, carriages, wagons and all related railway equipment
 Shuttleworth Collection, Old Warden, Bedfordshire – Pre-war automobiles, motorcycles and airplanes
 Solent Sky, Southampton, Hampshire – Aircraft
 Southampton Maritime Museum, Southampton, Hampshire – Maritime
 Streetlife Museum, Kingston upon Hull – Bicycles, carriages, cars, railway and Streetscene
 Swindon Steam Railway Museum – Railway
 The Transport Museum, Wythall, Worcestershire – Buses and electric cars
 Trolleybus Museum at Sandtoft, Lincolnshire – Trolleys
 Whitewebbs Museum of Transport, Enfield, London – Cars, trucks, fire engines, motorcycles, memorabilia, etc.
 Yorkshire Air Museum – Aircraft

Northern Ireland
Ulster Folk and Transport Museum, Belfast – all kinds of transport

Scotland
Glasgow Museum of Transport (now closed)
Museum of Flight, East Lothian Aerospace
Riverside Museum, Glasgow (the city's new transport museum, opened in 2011)
Grampian Transport Museum, Aberdeenshire
Dundee Museum of Transport, Dundee
Scottish Vintage Bus Museum, Lathalmond, Fife

Wales
Pembrokeshire Motor Museum – cars
Pendine Museum of Speed – cars
Swansea Bus Museum - buses

United States

Alabama
Barber Vintage Motorsports Museum, Leeds, Alabama
Heart of Dixie Railroad Museum, Calera, Alabama
Huntsville Depot, Huntsville, Alabama
North Alabama Railroad Museum, Huntsville, Alabama
US Space & Rocket Center, Huntsville, Alabama

Alaska
White Pass and Yukon Route from Skagway, Alaska to Whitehorse, Yukon

Arizona
Arizona Street Railway Museum, Phoenix, Arizona
Southern Arizona Transportation Museum, Tucson, Arizona

California
Aerospace Museum of California, McClellan Air Force Base, northeast of Sacramento, California
Cable Car Museum, San Francisco, California
California Automobile Museum, Sacramento, California
California State Railroad Museum, Sacramento, California (located in Old Sacramento)
Golden Gate Railroad Museum, formerly San Francisco, California – relocated to Niles Canyon Railway in Sunol, California
Hiller Aviation Museum, San Carlos, California
Oakland Aviation Museum, Oakland, California
Pacific Bus Museum, Fremont, California
Pacific Coast Air Museum, Santa Rosa, California
Petersen Automotive Museum, Los Angeles, California
San Diego Air & Space Museum, San Diego, California
San Diego Model Railroad Museum, San Diego, California
San Francisco Maritime Museum, San Francisco, California
San Francisco Railway Museum, San Francisco, California
South Coast Railroad Museum, Goleta, California
Southern California Railway Museum, Perris, California
Travel Town Museum, Los Angeles, California
Western Pacific Railroad Museum, Portola, California
Western Railway Museum, Rio Vista, California

Colorado
Colorado Railroad Museum, Golden, Colorado
Durango and Silverton Narrow Gauge Railroad, Durango, Colorado
Forney Transportation Museum, Denver, Colorado 
Golden Oldy Cyclery, The Sustainable Museum of Sustainable Transportation, Golden, Colorado, pre-1900 bicycles and tricycles & 21st century electric cars in a carbon negative museum.

Connecticut
Connecticut Trolley Museum, East Windsor, Connecticut
Shore Line Trolley Museum, East Haven, Connecticut

District of Columbia
National Air and Space Museum (Smithsonian), Washington, D.C.

Florida
Gold Coast Railroad Museum, Florida
National Naval Aviation Museum, formerly known as the National Museum of Naval Aviation and the Naval Aviation Museum, Naval Air Station Pensacola, Florida.
Tallahassee Automobile Museum, Tallahassee, Florida
Tampa Bay Automobile Museum, Pinellas Park, Florida

Georgia
Delta Heritage Museum, Atlanta, Georgia
Southeastern Railway Museum, Atlanta, Georgia

Illinois
Illinois Railway Museum, Union, Illinois
Monticello Railway Museum, Monticello, Illinois
Volo Auto Museum, Volo, Illinois

Indiana
Auburn Cord Duesenberg Museum, Auburn, Indiana
Grissom Air Museum, Grissom Air Reserve Base, Peru, Indiana
Indiana Aviation Museum, Valparaiso, Indiana
Indiana Railway Museum, French Lick, Indiana
Indiana Transportation Museum, Noblesville, Indiana

Iowa
Iowa Transportation Museum, Grinnell, Iowa

Kansas
Carona Train Museum, Carona, Kansas
Great Plains Transportation Museum, Wichita, Kansas
Midland Railway, Baldwin City, Kansas

Kentucky
Kentucky Railway Museum, New Haven, Kentucky
National Corvette Museum, Bowling Green, Kentucky

Maine
Owls Head Transportation Museum, Owls Head, Maine
Seashore Trolley Museum, Kennebunkport, Maine

Maryland
B&O Railroad Museum, Baltimore, Maryland, located at Mount Clare Station, the birthplace of American railroading.
Baltimore Streetcar Museum, Baltimore, Maryland. Located on Falls Road on the old MD & PA right of way.
Chesapeake and Ohio Canal National Historical Park from Georgetown, Washington, D.C. to Cumberland, Maryland
National Capital Trolley Museum, Montgomery County, Maryland

Massachusetts
American Heritage Museum, Stow, Massachusetts
Edaville Railroad, South Carver, Massachusetts
National Streetcar Museum, Lowell, Massachusetts
Shelburne Falls Trolley Museum, Shelburne Falls, Massachusetts

Michigan
Air Zoo, Portage, Michigan
Automotive Hall of Fame, Dearborn, Michigan
Ford Piquette Avenue Plant, Detroit, Michigan.  Birthplace of the Ford Model T and the oldest car factory building on Earth open to the general public (built 1904).
Gilmore Car Museum, Hickory Corners, Michigan 
Henry Ford Museum and Greenfield Village, Dearborn, Michigan
R.E. Olds Transportation Museum, Lansing, Michigan
Walter P. Chrysler Museum, Auburn Hills, Michigan
Yankee Air Museum, Belleville, Michigan

Minnesota
Bandana Square, Saint Paul, Minnesota, home of Twin Cities Model Railroad Club and old Northern Pacific Como shops.
Minnesota Transportation Museum, Saint Paul, Minnesota

Missouri
National Museum of Transportation, St. Louis, Missouri

Montana
Montana Auto Museum, Deer Lodge, Montana

Nevada
Nevada Northern Railway Museum, Ely, Nevada

New Hampshire
Conway Scenic Railroad, North Conway, New Hampshire

New York
Brooklyn Trolley Museum, Brooklyn, New York
Champlain Valley Transportation Museum, Plattsburgh, New York
New York Transit Museum, Brooklyn, New York
Old Rhinebeck Aerodrome, Rhinebeck, New York
Railroad Museum of the Niagara Frontier, North Tonawanda, New York
Trolley Museum of New York, Kingston, New York

North Carolina
North Carolina Transportation Museum, Spencer, North Carolina

Ohio
National Museum of the United States Air Force, formerly the US Air Force Museum, in Dayton, Ohio
Ohio Railway Museum, Worthington, Ohio

Oklahoma
Oklahoma Railway Museum, Oklahoma City, Oklahoma
Stafford Air & Space Museum, Weatherford, Oklahoma

Oregon
Columbia River Maritime Museum, Astoria, Oregon
Evergreen Aviation Museum, McMinnville, Oregon – Aviation,. Hughes H-4, Boeing B-17 und Supermarine Spitfire
Oregon Electric Railway Museum, Brooks, Oregon

Pennsylvania
American Helicopter Museum and Education Center, West Chester, Pennsylvania
Bicycle Heaven, Pittsburgh, Pennsylvania
Museum of Bus Transportation, Hershey, Pennsylvania
Pennsylvania Trolley Museum, Washington, Pennsylvania
Railroad Museum of Pennsylvania
Steamtown National Historic Site, Scranton, Pennsylvania

Rhode Island
Herreshoff Marine Museum, Bristol, Rhode Island

South Carolina
Transportation Museum of the World featuring the Miniature World of Trains, Greenville, South Carolina

Tennessee
Memphis Railroad and Trolley Museum, Memphis, Tennessee 
Tennessee Central Railway Museum, Nashville, Tennessee
Tennessee Valley Railroad Museum, Chattanooga, Tennessee

Texas
National Aviation Education Center, Dallas, Texas
Texas Museum of Automotive History, Dallas, Texas
Texas Transportation Museum, San Antonio, Texas

Utah
Golden Spike National Historic Site, Promontory Summit, Utah. Location of the completion of the First transcontinental railroad on May 10, 1869.

Virginia
Commonwealth Coach & Trolley Museum, Roanoke, Virginia 
Mariners' Museum, Newport News, Virginia 
Norfolk Southern Museum, Norfolk, Virginia
Steven F. Udvar-Hazy Center (Part of the Smithsonian National Air and Space Museum), Fairfax County, Virginia – Airplanes (Boeing B-29 Enola Gay) and Space Shuttle Enterprise
Virginia Museum of Transportation, Roanoke, Virginia

Washington
America's Car Museum, Tacoma, Washington
Flying Heritage Collection, Everett, Washington
Museum of Flight, Seattle, Washington
Naval Undersea Museum, Keyport, Washington – U-Boote 
Northwest Railway Museum, Snoqualmie, Washington

Wisconsin
East Troy Electric Railroad Museum, Wisconsin
Harley-Davidson Museum, Milwaukee, Wisconsin
National Railroad Museum, Green Bay, Wisconsin

Wyoming
Wyoming Transportation Museum, Cheyenne, Wyoming

Vatican City
Padiglione delle Carozze (Museo Storico, Vatican Museums)

Venezuela
Guillermo José Schael Transport Museum, Caracas, Venezuela

See also
List of aerospace museums
List of automobile museums
List of heritage railways
List of museum ships
List of railway museums
List of British railway museums
List of New Zealand railway museums and heritage lines

References

External links
MEXLIST List of Mexican rail and transport museums

Transport

Museums